Jorrin Nemiah John (born 6 November 1991) is a professional footballer who last played as a winger for Shepshed Dynamo. Born in England, he represented the country internationally at various youth levels before switching to the Antigua and Barbudan national team.

Club career
John came through the youth ranks of  Aston Villa and Leicester City. In February 2011, he joined Kettering Town on a month's loan. He was released by Leicester in May 2011.

In August 2011 he signed an 18-month deal with Thai Premier League champions Muangthong United spending the first months with Muangthong's sister club, Suphanburi, who play in Division One.

He then moved on loan to TTM. He then joined Nonthaburi

In March 2014, he returned to England and signed for Corby Town to maintain fitness before in July 2014, moving to Nuneaton Town.

In January 2015, he signed with NK Domžale.

In October 2017, he signed with Harrowby United and made his debut away to Rugby Town in the FA Vase 1st round proper.

In January 2018, he signed with six-times Cambodian League champion Phnom Penh Crown FC.

John signed for Southern League Division One Central side Bedworth United on 19 September 2020.

International career
John represented England at Under 16, Under 17, Under 18 and Under 19 levels. In October 2014 he was called up by Antigua and Barbuda making his full international debut on 8 October in a match against Saint Lucia in the Caribbean Cup. He was also part of the Antuguan team at the 2014 Caribbean Cup.

References

External links
 
 
 

1991 births
Living people
Antigua and Barbuda international footballers
Corby Town F.C. players
Nuneaton Borough F.C. players
Kettering Town F.C. players
Leicester City F.C. players
Jorrin John
Jorrin John
NK Domžale players
Harrowby United F.C. players
Phnom Penh Crown FC players
Bedworth United F.C. players
Shepshed Dynamo F.C. players
England youth international footballers
Expatriate footballers in Thailand
Antigua and Barbuda footballers
English footballers
2014 Caribbean Cup players
National League (English football) players
Expatriate footballers in Slovenia
Expatriate footballers in Cambodia
Association football forwards